Harold Ernest Bilbrough  (1867 – 15 November 1950) was the fourth Anglican Bishop of Dover in the modern era.

Life and career
Bilbrough was educated at Winchester and  New College, Oxford, he began his ecclesiastical career with a curacy at St Mary’s, South Shields and was successively Vicar of St John’s, Darlington, Rural Dean of Jarrow and then Sub-Dean of Liverpool Cathedral before his elevation to the episcopate as Bishop of Dover in 1916. He was nominated Bishop of Newcastle on 14 September and installed on 5 October 1927; he retired on 1 October 1941.

References

1867 births
People educated at Winchester College
Alumni of New College, Oxford
Bishops of Dover, Kent
Bishops of Newcastle
20th-century Church of England bishops
1950 deaths